Dublin Connolly DART station was a railway station, that was located next to Dublin Connolly railway station in Dublin.
The station opened in 1984 and closed in 1999.

History
The station opened on 23 July 1984, to allow the DART service to stop.

In 1999, Dublin Connolly was completely renovated and partially rebuilt. Dublin Connolly DART station closed, and a new entrance to was put in to connect platforms 6 and 7 to Dublin Connolly railway station.

See also
 List of railway stations in Ireland

References

Disused railway stations in County Dublin
Railway stations opened in 1984
Railway stations closed in 1999
1984 establishments in Ireland
1999 disestablishments in Ireland
Railway stations in the Republic of Ireland opened in the 20th century